Eat to the Beat is the fourth studio album by American rock band Blondie, released on September 28, 1979, by Chrysalis Records. The album was certified Platinum in the United States, where it spent a year on the Billboard 200. It also reached  on the UK Albums Chart in October 1979 and has been certified Platinum by the British Phonographic Industry (BPI).

Musical style
The primarily pop album includes a diverse range of styles in the songs: rock, disco, new wave, punk, reggae, and funk, as well as a lullaby. "Atomic" and "The Hardest Part" fused disco with rock. Blondie's first two albums were new wave productions, followed by Parallel Lines which dropped the new wave material, exchanging it entirely for rock-inflected pop. Eat to the Beat continued in this pop direction.

History
Three singles were released in the UK from this album ("Dreaming", "Union City Blue" and "Atomic"). "The Hardest Part" was released as the second single from the album in the US instead of "Union City Blue" (though a remix of "Union..." would be released in the US in 1995). According to the liner notes of the 1994 compilation The Platinum Collection, the song "Slow Motion" was originally planned to be the fourth single release from the album, and producer Mike Chapman even made a remix of the track, but following the unexpected success of "Call Me", the theme song to the movie American Gigolo, these plans were shelved and the single mix of "Slow Motion" remains unreleased. An alternate mix of the track entitled The Stripped Down Motown Mix did, however, turn up on one of the many remix singles issued by Chrysalis/EMI in the mid-1990s.

Blondie's first video album was produced in conjunction with this record, featuring a music video for each of the album's twelve songs. It was the first such project in rock music. Most of the videos were filmed in and around New York. One of the exceptions was the "Union City Blue" music video, which was filmed at Union Dry Dock, Weehawken, New Jersey. Each video was directed by David Mallet and produced by Paul Flattery. The video was initially available as a promotional VHS in 1979 and subsequently released on videocassette and videodisc in October 1980.

Unlike the rest of Blondie's original albums, Eat to the Beat was not remastered in 1994. It was later digitally remastered and reissued by EMI-Capitol in 2001, with four bonus tracks and candid sleeve notes by Mike Chapman:

The 2001 remaster was again reissued in 2007 (June 26 in the US; July 2 in the UK) without the four bonus tracks. Included instead was a DVD of the long-since deleted Eat to the Beat video album, marking the first time it had been made available on the DVD format.

Critical reception

Reviewing Eat to the Beat in 1979, Village Voice critic Robert Christgau felt that the record was not "a tour de force" like Blondie's previous album Parallel Lines and expressed reservations about "the overarching fatalism" of its lyrics, but noted that he liked "the way the lyrics depart from pop bohemia to speak directly to the mass audience they're reaching. And Debbie just keeps getting better." Debra Rae Cohen of Rolling Stone found the album "not only ambitious in its range of styles, but also unexpectedly and vibrantly compelling without sacrificing any of the group's urbane, modish humor." A review in People observed that the band sounded "less raw but still fresh." David Hepworth, writing in Smash Hits, praised it as a "brasher, more rocking follow-up... as hard and shiny as glass and I love it." Eat to the Beat was voted the 17th best album of 1979 in The Village Voices year-end Pazz & Jop critics' poll.

In a retrospective review, William Ruhlmann of AllMusic viewed Eat to the Beat as a "secondhand" version of Parallel Lines, finding that its similar attempts at "rock/disco fusion" were less effective, while "elsewhere, the band just tried to cover too many stylistic bases." In contrast, BBC Music writer Chris Jones opined that Blondie had successfully expanded on the sound of Parallel Lines on Eat to the Beat, which he said "still sounds box fresh today", praising Mike Chapman's production expertise and the album's musical diversity.

Track listing

Video album (12-inch LaserDisc format)
 "Eat to the Beat"
 "The Hardest Part"
 "Union City Blue"
 "Slow Motion"
 "Shayla"
 "Die Young Stay Pretty"
 "Accidents Never Happen"
 "Atomic"
 "Living in the Real World"
 "Sound-A-Sleep"
 "Victor"
 "Dreaming"

Bonus videos on side two of videodisc release
 "Heart of Glass"
 "Picture This"
 "(I'm Always Touched by Your) Presence, Dear"
 "Hanging on the Telephone"

Personnel
Credits adapted from the liner notes of Eat to the Beat.

Blondie
 Clem Burke – drums
 Jimmy Destri – keyboards,  backing vocals on "Die Young Stay Pretty" and "Victor"
 Nigel Harrison – bass guitar
 Deborah Harry – vocals
 Frank Infante – guitars,  backing vocals on "Die Young Stay Pretty" and "Victor"
 Chris Stein – guitars

Additional musicians
 Ellie Greenwich – backing vocals on "Dreaming" and "Atomic"
 Lorna Luft – backing vocals on "Accidents Never Happen" and "Slow Motion"
 Donna Destri – backing vocals on "Living in the Real World"
 Mike Chapman – backing vocals on "Die Young Stay Pretty" and "Victor"
 Randy Hennes – harmonica on "Eat to the Beat"

Technical
 Mike Chapman – production
 Dave Tickle – engineering
 Peter Coleman – engineering
 Steve Hall – mastering at MCA Whitney Studios (Glendale, California)
 Kevin Flaherty – production (2001 reissue)

Artwork
 Norman Seeff – photography, design
 John Van Hamersveld – typography, design
 Billy Bass – art direction

Charts

Weekly charts

Year-end charts

Certifications

References

Bibliography

 

1979 albums
1979 video albums
Albums produced by Mike Chapman
Albums recorded at Electric Lady Studios
Albums recorded at the Hammersmith Apollo
Albums with cover art by John Van Hamersveld
Blondie (band) albums
Chrysalis Records albums